Børge Daniel Raahauge Nielsen (26 March 1920 – 5 October 2010) was a Danish rower who competed in the 1948 Summer Olympics.

He was born in Køge. In 1948 he was a crew member of the Danish boat which won the bronze medal in the coxed four event.

References

External links
Børge Raahauge Nielsen's obituary 
Børge Raahauge Nielsen's death notice 

1920 births
2010 deaths
Danish male rowers
Olympic rowers of Denmark
Rowers at the 1948 Summer Olympics
Olympic bronze medalists for Denmark
Olympic medalists in rowing
Medalists at the 1948 Summer Olympics
People from Køge Municipality
Sportspeople from Region Zealand